USS Pleiades is a name used more than once by the U.S. Navy:

  built in 1900 by the Maryland Steel Co., Sparrows Point, Maryland, and served briefly in World War I.
 , commissioned 25 October 1941 for service in World War II.

United States Navy ship names